The 2014 NCAA Division II men's soccer championship featured 35 schools in four unbalanced Super-Regional tournaments involving seven to ten teams each. Super-Regional games were played at campus sites.

The Division II College Cup was held at Owsley B. Frazier Stadium in Louisville, Kentucky as part of the NCAA Division II National Championships Fall Festival, hosted by Bellarmine University and the Louisville Sports Commission. The Lynn University Fighting Knights defeated the University of Charleston Golden Eagles 3–2 to win their third DII title and their second in three years.

East Super-Regional
Source:

Midwest Super-Regional
Source:

South Super-Regional
Source:

West Super-Regional
Source:

Division II College Cup at Louisville, Kentucky.
Source:

Attendance: Semi #1 = 300; Semi #2 = 200; Final = 300

Final

References

External links
NCAA Men's Division II Soccer

NCAA Division II Men's Soccer Championship
NCAA Division II Men's Soccer Championship
NCAA Division II Men's Soccer Championship
NCAA Division II Men's Soccer Championship
NCAA Division II Men's Soccer Championship
Sports competitions in Louisville, Kentucky
Bellarmine University
Lynn Fighting Knights men's soccer